Ob is a town in Novosibirsk Oblast, Russia, located  west of Novosibirsk, the administrative center of the oblast. Population:

History
Originally known as the settlement of Tolmachyovo, it was renamed Ob in 1934 and granted town status in 1969.

Administrative and municipal status
Within the framework of administrative divisions, it is incorporated as the Town of Ob—an administrative unit with the status equal to that of the districts. As a municipal division, the Town of Ob is incorporated as Ob Urban Okrug.

Transportation
The town hosts the Novosibirsk Tolmachevo Airport.

The headquarters of the S7 Airlines company is located in Ob, which is currently Russia's fastest growing airline and has passed Aeroflot as Russia's largest domestic airline.

References

Notes

Sources

External links
Website of Ob 

Cities and towns in Novosibirsk Oblast